The Minnesota Multiphasic Personality Inventory (MMPI) is a standardized psychometric test of adult personality and psychopathology. Psychologists and other mental health professionals use various versions of the MMPI to help develop treatment plans, assist with differential diagnosis, help answer legal questions (forensic psychology), screen job candidates during the personnel selection process, or as part of a therapeutic assessment procedure.

The original MMPI was developed by Starke R. Hathaway and J. C. McKinley, faculty of the University of Minnesota, and first published by the University of Minnesota Press in 1943. It was replaced by an updated version, the MMPI-2, in 1989 (Butcher, Dahlstrom, Graham, Tellegen, and Kaemmer). A version for adolescents, the MMPI-A, was published in 1992. An alternative version of the test, the MMPI-2 Restructured Form (MMPI-2-RF), published in 2008, retains some aspects of the traditional MMPI assessment strategy, but adopts a different theoretical approach to personality test development. The newest version (MMPI-3) was released in 2020.

History 
The original authors of the MMPI were American psychologist Starke R. Hathaway and American neurologist J. C. McKinley. The MMPI is copyrighted by the University of Minnesota.

The MMPI was designed as an adult measure of psychopathology and personality structure in 1939. Many additions and changes to the measure have been made over time to improve interpretability of the original clinical scales. Additionally, there have been changes in the number of items in the measure, and other adjustments which reflect its current use as a tool towards modern psychopathy and personality disorders. The most historically significant developmental changes include:

In 1989, the MMPI became the MMPI-2 as a result of a restandardization project to develop a new set of normative data representing current population characteristics; the restandardization increased the size of the normative database to include a wide range of clinical and non-clinical samples; psychometric characteristics of the clinical scales were not addressed at that time.
In 2003, the Restructured Clinical scales were added to the published MMPI-2, representing a reconstruction of the original clinical scales designed to address known psychometric flaws in the original clinical scales that unnecessarily complicated their interpretability and validity, but could not be addressed at the same time as the restandardization process. Specifically, Demoralization – a non-specific distress component thought to impair the discriminant validity of many self-report measures of psychopathology – was identified and removed from the original clinical scales. Restructuring the clinical scales was the initial step toward addressing the remaining psychometric and theoretical problems of the MMPI-2.
In 2008, the MMPI-2-RF (Restructured Form) was published to psychometrically and theoretically fine-tuned the measure. The MMPI-2-RF contains 338 items, contains 9 validity and 42 homogeneous substantive scales, and allows for a straightforward interpretation strategy. The MMPI-2-RF was constructed using a similar rationale used to create the Restructured Clinical (RC) scales. The rest of the measure was developed utilizing statistical analysis techniques that produced the RC scales as well as a hierarchical set of scales similar to contemporary models of psychopathology to inform the overall measure reorganization. The entire measure reconstruction was accomplished using the original 567 items contained in the MMPI-2 item pool. The MMPI-2 Restandardization norms were used to validate the MMPI-2-RF; over 53,000 correlations based on more than 600 reference criteria are available in the MMPI-2-RF Technical Manual for the purpose of comparing the validity and reliability of MMPI-2-RF scales with those of the MMPI-2. Across multiple studies and as supported in the technical manual, the MMPI-2-RF performs as good as or, in many cases, better than the MMPI-2.
The MMPI-2-RF is a streamlined measure. Retaining only 338 of the original 567 items, its hierarchical scale structure provides non-redundant information across 51 scales that are easily interpretable. Validity scales were retained (revised), two new validity scales have been added (Fs in 2008 and RBS in 2011), and there are new scales that capture somatic complaints. All of the MMPI-2-RF's scales demonstrate either increased or equivalent construct and criterion validity compared to their MMPI-2 counterparts.

Current versions of the test (MMPI-2 and MMPI-2-RF) can be completed on optical scan forms or administered directly to individuals on the computer. The MMPI-2 can generate a Score Report or an Extended Score Report, which includes the Restructured Clinical scales from which the Restructured Form was later developed. The MMPI-2 Extended Score Report includes scores on the original clinical scales as well as Content, Supplementary, and other subscales of potential interest to clinicians. Additionally, the MMPI-2-RF computer scoring offers an option for the administrator to select a specific reference group with which to contrast and compare an individual's obtained scores; comparison groups include clinical, non-clinical, medical, forensic, and pre-employment settings, to name a few. The newest version of the Pearson Q-Local computer scoring program offers the option of converting MMPI-2 data into MMPI-2-RF reports as well as numerous other new features. Use of the MMPI is tightly controlled. Any clinician using the MMPI is required to meet specific test publisher requirements in terms of training and experience, must pay for all administration materials including the annual computer scoring license and is charged for each report generated by computer.

In 2018, the University of Minnesota Press commissioned development of the MMPI-3, which was to be based in part on the MMPI-2-RF and include updated normative data. It was published in December 2020.

MMPI 

The original MMPI was developed on a scale-by-scale basis in the late 1930s and early 1940s. Hathaway and McKinley used an empirical [criterion] keying approach, with clinical scales  derived by selecting items that were endorsed by patients known to have been diagnosed with certain pathologies. The difference between this approach and other test development strategies used around that time was that it was in many ways atheoretical (not based on any particular theory) and thus the initial test was not aligned with the prevailing psychodynamic theories. Theory in some ways affected the development process, if only because the candidate test items and patient groups on which scales were developed were affected by prevailing personality and psychopathological theories of the time. The approach to MMPI development ostensibly enabled the test to capture aspects of human psychopathology that were recognizable and meaningful, despite changes in clinical theories.
However, the MMPI had flaws of validity that were soon apparent and could not be overlooked indefinitely. The control group for its original testing consisted of a small number of individuals, mostly young, white, and married men and women from rural areas of the Midwest. (The racial makeup of the respondents reflected the ethnic makeup of that time and place.) The MMPI also faced problems as to its terminology and its irrelevance to the population that the test was intended to measure. It became necessary for the MMPI to measure a more diverse number of potential mental health problems, such as "suicidal tendencies, drug abuse, and treatment-related behaviors."

MMPI-2 

The first major revision of the MMPI was the MMPI-2, which was standardized on a new national sample of adults in the United States and released in 1989. The new standardization was based on 2,600 individuals from a more representative background than the MMPI. It is appropriate for use with adults 18 and over. Subsequent revisions of certain test elements have been published, and a wide variety of sub scales were introduced over many years to help clinicians interpret the results of the original 10 clinical scales. The current MMPI-2 has 567 items, and usually takes between one and two hours to complete depending on reading level. It is designed to require a sixth-grade reading level. There is an infrequently used abbreviated form of the test that consists of the MMPI-2's first 370 items. The shorter version has been mainly used in circumstances that have not allowed the full version to be completed (e.g., illness or time pressure), but the scores available on the shorter version are not as extensive as those available in the 567-item version. The original form of the MMPI-2 is the third most frequently utilized test in the field of psychology, behind the most used IQ and achievement tests.

MMPI-A 

A version of the test designed for adolescents ages 14 to 18, the MMPI-A, was released in 1992. The youth version was developed to improve measurement of personality, behavior difficulties, and psychopathology among adolescents. It addressed limitations of using the original MMPI among adolescent populations. Twelve- to thirteen-year-old children were assessed and could not adequately understand the question content so the MMPI-A is not meant for children younger than 14. Children who are 18 and no longer in high school may appropriately be tested with the MMPI-2.

Some concerns related to use of the MMPI with youth included inadequate item content, lack of appropriate norms, and problems with extreme reporting. For example, many items were written from an adult perspective, and did not cover content critical to adolescents (e.g., peers, school). Likewise, adolescent norms were not published until the 1970s, and there was not consensus on whether adult or adolescent norms should be used when the instrument was administered to youth. Finally, the use of adult norms tended to overpathologize adolescents, who demonstrated elevations on most original MMPI scales (e.g., T scores greater than 70 on the F validity scale; marked elevations on clinical scales 8 and 9). Therefore, an adolescent version was developed and tested during the restandardization process of the MMPI, which resulted in the MMPI-A.

The MMPI-A has 478 items. It includes the original 10 clinical scales (Hs, D, Hy, Pd, Mf, Pa, Pt, Sc, Ma, Si), six validity scales (?, L, F, F1, F2, K, VRIN, TRIN), 31 Harris Lingoes subscales, 15 content component scales (A-anx, A-obs, A-dep, A-hea, A-ain, A-biz, A-ang, A-cyn, A-con, A-lse, A-las, A-sod, A-fam, A-sch, A-trt), the Personality Psychopathology Five (PSY-5) scales (AGGR, PSYC, DISC, NEGE, INTR), three social introversion subscales (Shyness/Self-Consciousness, Social Avoidance, Alienation), and six supplementary scales (A, R, MAC-R, ACK, PRO, IMM). There is also a short form of 350 items, which covers the basic scales (validity and clinical scales). The validity, clinical, content, and supplementary scales of the MMPI-A have demonstrated adequate to strong test-retest reliability, internal consistency, and validity.

A four factor model (similar to all of the MMPI instruments) was chosen for the MMPI-A and included
 General Maladjustment,
 Over-control (repression) (L, K, Ma),
 Si (Social Introversion),
 MF (Masculine/Feminine).

The MMPI-A normative and clinical samples included 805 males and 815 females, ages 14 to 18, recruited from eight schools across the United States and 420 males and 293 females ages 14 to 18 recruited from treatment facilities in Minneapolis, Minnesota, respectively. Norms were prepared by standardizing raw scores using a uniform t-score transformation, which was developed by Auke Tellegen and adopted for the MMPI-2. This technique preserves the positive skew of scores but also allows percentile comparison.

Strengths of the MMPI-A include the use of adolescent norms, appropriate and relevant item content, inclusion of a shortened version, a clear and comprehensive manual, and strong evidence of validity.

Critiques of the MMPI-A include a non-representative clinical norms sample, overlap in what the clinical scales measure, irrelevance of the mf scale, as well as long length and high reading level of the instrument.

The MMPI-A is one of the most commonly used instruments among adolescent populations.

A restructured form of the MMPI-A, the MMPI-A-RF was published in 2016.

MMPI-2-RF 

The University of Minnesota Press published a new version of the MMPI-2, the MMPI-2 Restructured Form (MMPI-2-RF), in 2008. The MMPI-2-RF builds on the Restructured Clinical (RC) scales developed in 2003, and subsequently subjected to extensive research, with an overriding goal of improved discriminant validity, or the ability of the test to reliably differentiate between clinical syndromes or diagnoses. Most of the MMPI and MMPI-2 Clinical Scales are relatively heterogeneous, i.e., they measure diverse groupings of signs and symptoms, such that an elevation on Scale 2 (Depression), for example, may or may not indicate a depressive disorder. The MMPI-2-RF scales, on the other hand, are fairly homogeneous; are designed to more precisely measure distinct symptom constellations or disorders. From a theoretical perspective, the MMPI-2-RF scales rest on an assumption that psychopathology is a homogeneous condition that is additive.

Advances in psychometric theory, test development methods, and statistical analyses used to develop the MMPI-2-RF were not available when the MMPI was developed.

MMPI-3 
The MMPI-3 was released in December 2020. Its primary goals were to enhance the item pool, update the test norms, optimize existing scales, and introduce new scales (that assess disordered eating, compulsivity, impulsivity, and self-importance). It features a new, nationally representative normative sample, selected to match projections for race and ethnicity, education, and age. Spanish language norms are available for use with the U.S. Spanish translation of the MMPI-3.

Scale composition

Clinical scales 
The original clinical scales were designed to measure common diagnoses of the era.

Code Types 
Codetypes are a combination of the two or three (and according to a few authors even four) highest-scoring clinical scales (e.g. 4, 8, 6 = 486). Codetypes are interpreted as a single, wider ranged elevation, rather than interpreting each scale individually. For profiles without defined code types interpretation should focus on the individual scales.

Psychopathic Deviate 
This scale comes from the Minnesota Multiphasic Personality Inventory-2 (MMPI-2), where 50 statements compose the Psychopathic Deviate subscale. The 50 statements must be answered in true or false format as applied to one's self.

The Psychopathic Deviate scale measures general social maladjustment and the absence of strongly pleasant experiences. The items on this scale tap into complaints about family and authority figures in general, self-alienation, social alienation and boredom.

When diagnosing psychopathy, the MMPI-2's Psychopathic Deviate scale is considered one of the traditional personality tests that contain subscales relating to psychopathy, though they assess relatively non-specific tendencies towards antisocial or criminal behavior.

Clinical subscales
The clinical scales are heterogeneous for their item content. To assist clinicians in interpreting the scales, researchers have developed subscales of more homogeneous items within each scale. The Harris–Lingoes (1955) scales was one of the most widely used results of this approach and were included in the MMPI-2 and MMPI-A.

Restructured Clinical (RC) scales 

The Restructured Clinical scales were designed to be psychometrically improved versions of the original clinical scales, which were known to contain a high level of interscale correlation, overlapping items, and were confounded by the presence of an overarching factor that has since been extracted and placed in a separate scale (demoralization). The RC scales measure the core constructs of the original clinical scales.  Critics of the RC scales assert they have deviated too far from the original clinical scales, the implication being that previous research done on the clinical scales will not be relevant to the interpretation of the RC scales. However, researchers on the RC scales assert that the RC scales predict pathology in their designated areas better than their concordant original clinical scales while using significantly fewer items and maintaining equal to higher internal consistency, reliability and validity; further, unlike the original clinical scales, the RC scales are not saturated with the primary factor (demoralization, now captured in RCdem) which frequently produced diffuse elevations and made interpretation of results difficult; finally, the RC scales have lower interscale correlations and, in contrast to the original clinical scales, contain no interscale item overlap. The effects of removal of the common variance spread across the older clinical scales due to a general factor common to psychopathology, through use of sophisticated psychometric methods, was described as a paradigm shift in personality assessment. Critics of the new scales argue that the removal of this common variance makes the RC scales less ecologically valid (less like real life) because real patients tend to present complex patterns of symptoms. Proponents of the MMPI-2-RF argue that this potential problem is addressed by being able to view elevations on other RC scales that are less saturated with the general factor and, therefore, are also more transparent and much easier to interpret.

Validity scales

The validity scales in all versions of the MMPI-2 (MMPI-2 and RF) contain three basic types of validity measures: those that were designed to detect non-responding or inconsistent responding (CNS, VRIN, TRIN), those designed to detect when clients are over reporting or exaggerating the prevalence or severity of psychological symptoms (F, Fb, Fp, FBS), and those designed to detect when test-takers are under-reporting or downplaying psychological symptoms (L, K, S). A new addition to the validity scales for the MMPI-2-RF includes an over reporting scale of somatic symptoms (Fs) as well as revised versions of the validity scales of the MMPI-2 (VRIN-r, TRIN-r, F-r, Fp-r, FBS-r, L-r, and K-r).  The MMPI-2-RF does not include the S or Fb scales, and the F-r scale now covers the entirety of the test.

Content scales

Although elevations on the clinical scales are significant indicators of certain psychological conditions, it is difficult to determine exactly what specific behaviors the high scores are related to. The content scales of the MMPI-2 were developed for the purpose of increasing the incremental validity of the clinical scales. The content scales contain items intended to provide insight into specific types of symptoms and areas of functioning that the clinical scales do not measure, and are supposed to be used in addition to the clinical scales to interpret profiles. They were developed by Butcher, Graham, Williams and Ben-Porath using similar rational and statistical procedures as Wiggins who developed the original MMPI content scales.

The items on the content scales contain obvious content and therefore are susceptible to response bias – exaggeration or denial of symptoms, and should be interpreted with caution. T scores greater than 65 on any content scale are considered high scores.

Content component scales
The MMPI-2 and MMPI-A included subscales for some of the content scales to further specify the results. For example, Depression (DEP) was broken down into Lack of drive (DEP), Dysphoria (DEP), Self-depreciation (DEP) and Suicidal ideation (DEP).

Supplemental scales 

To supplement these multidimensional scales and to assist in interpreting the frequently seen diffuse elevations due to the general factor (removed in the RC scales) were also developed, with the more frequently used being the substance abuse scales (MAC-R, APS, AAS), designed to assess the extent to which a client admits to or is prone to abusing substances, and the A (anxiety) and R (repression) scales, developed by Welsh after conducting a factor analysis of the original MMPI item pool.

PSY-5 (Personality Psychopathology Five) scales 

The PSY-5 is set of scales measuring dimensional traits of personality disorders, originally developed from factor analysis of the personality disorder content of the Diagnostic and Statistical Manual of Mental Disorders. Originally, these scales were titled: Aggressiveness, Psychoticism, Constraint, Negative Emotionality/Neuroticism, and Positive Emotionality/Extraversion; however, in the most current edition of the MMPI-2 and MMPI-2-RF, the Constraint and Positive Emotionality scales have been reversed and renamed as Disconstraint and Introversion / Low Positive Emotionality.

Across several large samples including clinical, college, and normative populations, the MMPI-2 PSY-5 scales showed moderate internal consistency and intercorrelations comparable with the domain scales on the NEO-PI-R Big Five personality measure. Also, scores on the MMPI-2 PSY-5 scales appear to be similar across genders, and the structure of the PSY-5 has been reproduced in a Dutch psychiatric sample.

MMPI-A-RF 
The Minnesota Multiphasic Personality Inventory – Adolescent – Restructured Form (MMPI-A-RF) is a broad-band instrument used to psychologically evaluate adolescents. It was published in 2016 and was primarily authored by Robert P. Archer, Richard W. Handel, Yossef S. Ben-Porath, and Auke Tellegen. It is a revised version of the Minnesota Multiphasic Personality Inventory – Adolescent (MMPI-A). Like the MMPI-A, this version is intended for use with adolescents aged 14–18 years old. It consists of 241 true-false items which produce scores on 48 scales: 6 Validity scales (VRIN-r, TRIN-r, CRIN, F-r, L-r, K-r), 3 Higher-Order scales (EID, THD, BXD), 9 Restructured Clinical scales (RCd, RC1, RC2, RC3, RC4, RC6, RC7, RC8, RC9), 25 Specific Problem scales, and revised versions of the MMPI-A PSY-5 scales (AGGR-r, PSYC-r, DISC-r, NEGE-r, INTR-r). It also features 14 critical items, including 7 regarding depressing and suicidal ideation.

The MMPI-A-RF was designed to address limitations of its predecessor, such as the scale heterogeneity and item overlap of the original clinical scales. The weaknesses of the clinical scales resulted in intercorrelations of several MMPI-A scales and limited discriminant validity of the scales. To address the issues with the clinical scales, the MMPI-A underwent a revision similar to the restructuring of the MMPI-2 to the MMPI-2-RF. Specifically, a demoralization scale was developed, and each clinical scale underwent exploratory factor analysis to identify its distinctive components.

Additionally, the Specific Problems (SP) scales were developed. Whereas the RC scales provide a broad overview of psychological problems (e.g., low positive emotions or symptoms of depression; antisocial behavior; bizarre thoughts), the SP scales offered narrow, focused descriptions of the problems the individual reported he or she was experiencing. The MMPI-2-RF SP Scales were used as a template. First, corresponding items from the MMPI-2-RF were identified in the MMPI-A, and then 58 items unique to the MMPI-A were added to the item pool. This way the MMPI-A-RF SP scales could maintain continuity with the MMPI-2-RF but also address issues specific to adolescent problems. After a preliminary set of SP scales were developed based on their content, each scale went through statistical tests (factor analysis) to make sure they did not overlap or relate too strongly to the RC demoralization scale.   Additional statistical analyses were done to make sure each SP scale contained items that were strongly related (correlated) with its scale and less strongly associated with other scales; in the end, each item appeared on only one SP scale. These scales were developed to provide additional information in association with the RC scales, but SP scales are not subscales and can be interpreted even when the related RC scale is not elevated. 
   
As noted above, 25 SP scales were developed. Of these, 19 have the same names as the corresponding MMPI-2-RF SP scales, although the specific items that make up SP scales on each form are different. The following 5 scales were unique to the MMPI-A-RF: Obsessions/Compulsions (OCS), Antisocial Attitudes (ASA), Conduct Problems (CNP), Negative Peer Influence (NPI) and Specific Fears (SPF).
 
The SP scales were organized into four groupings: Somatic/Cognitive, Internalizing, Externalizing, and Interpersonal Scales. The Somatic/Cognitive scales (MLS, GIC, HPC, NUC, and COG) share their names with the SP scales on the MMPI-2-RF, are related to RC1, and focus on aspects of physical health and functioning. There are nine Internalizing scales. The first three (HLP, SFD, and NFC) are related to aspects of demoralization, or the general sense of unhappiness, and the remaining scales (OCS, STW, AXY, ANP, BRF, SPF) assess for Dysfunctional Negative Emotions (e.g., a tendency toward worry, fearfulness, and anxiety). Six Externalizing scales (NSA, ASA, CNP, SUB, NPI, and AGG) are related to antisocial behavior, and the need for excitement and stimulating activity (i.e., hypomanic activation). Finally, Interpersonal scales (FML, IPP, SAV, SHY, and DSF), while not related to particular RC scales, focus on aspects of social and relational functioning with family and peers.

Additionally, the 478-item length of the MMPI-A was identified as a challenge to adolescent attention span and concentration. To address this, the MMPI-A-RF has less than half the items of the MMPI-A.

Higher-Order scales
Higher-Order (H-O) Scales were introduced with the MMPI-2-RF and they are identical in the MMPI-A-RF and the MMPI-3. Their function is to assess problems of three general areas of functioning: affective, cognitive (thought) and behavioral.

Specific Problems (SP) scales

Interest Scales
The MMPI-2-RF includes two Interest Scales. The Aesthetic-Literary Interests (AES) scale rates interest in literature, music and theater, and the Mechanical-Physical Interests (MEC) scale measures interest in fixing and building things, the outdoors and sports.

Criticism 

Like many standardized tests, scores on the various scales of the MMPI-2 and the MMPI-2-RF are not representative of either percentile rank or how "well" or "poorly" someone has done on the test. Rather, analysis looks at relative elevation of factors compared to the various norm groups studied. Raw scores on the scales are transformed into a standardized metric known as T-scores (mean equals 50, standard deviation equals 10), making interpretation easier for clinicians. Test manufacturers and publishers ask test purchasers to prove they are qualified to purchase the MMPI/MMPI-2/MMPI-2-RF and other tests.

Addition of the Lees-Haley FBS (Symptom Validity) 

Psychologist Paul Lees-Haley developed the FBS (Fake Bad Scale). Although the FBS acronym remains in use, the official name for the scale changed to Symptom Validity Scale when it was incorporated into the standard scoring reports produced by Pearson, the licensed publisher. Some psychologists question the validity and utility of the FBS scale. The peer-reviewed journal Psychological Injury and Law published a series of pro and con articles in 2008, 2009, and 2010. Investigations of the factor structure of the Symptom Validity Scale (FBS and FBS-r) raise doubts about the scale's construct and predictive validity in the detection of malingering.

Racial disparity

One of the biggest criticisms of the original MMPI has been the difference between whites and non-whites.

In the 1970s, Charles McCreary and Eligio Padilla from UCLA compared scores of Black, white and Mexican-American men and found that non-whites tended to score five points higher on the test. They stated: "There is continuing controversy about the appropriateness of the MMPI when decisions involve persons from non-white racial and ethnic backgrounds. In general, studies of such divergent populations as prison inmates, medical patients, psychiatric patients, and high school and college students have found that blacks usually score higher than whites on the L, F, Sc, and Ma scales. There is near agreement that the notion of more psychopathology in racial ethnic minority groups is simplistic and untenable. Nevertheless, three divergent explanations of racial differences on the MMPI have been suggested. Black-white MMPI differences reflect variations in values, conceptions, and expectations that result from growing up in different cultures. Another point of view maintains that differences on the MMPI between blacks and whites are not a reflection of racial differences, but rather a reflection of overriding socioeconomic variations between racial groups. Thirdly, MMPI scales may reflect socioeconomic factors, while other scales are primarily race-related."

Translations of the MMPI

MMPI-2
The MMPI-2 is currently available in 22 different languages, including:

 Bulgarian
 Chinese
 Croatian
 Czech 
 Danish
 Dutch/Flemish
 French
 Canada (Canadian French & English)
 German
 Greek
 Hebrew
 Hmong
 Hungarian
 Italian
 Korean
 Norwegian
 Polish
 Romanian
 Slovak
 Spanish for Mexico & Central America
 Spanish for Spain, South America & Central America
 Spanish for the US
 Swedish
 Ukrainian

MMPI-2 in Chinese 
The Chinese MMPI-2 was developed by Fanny M. Cheung, Weizhen Song, and Jianxin Zhang for Hong Kong and adapted for use in the mainland. The Chinese MMPI was used as a base instrument from which some items, that were the same in the MMPI-2, were retained. New items on the Chinese MMPI-2 underwent translation from English to Chinese and then back translation from Chinese to English to establish uniformity of the items and their content. The psychometrics are robust with the Chinese MMPI-2 having high reliability (a measure of whether the results of the scale are consistent). Reliability coefficients were found to be over 0.8 for the test in Hong Kong and were between 0.58 and 0.91 across scales for the mainland. In addition, the correlation of the Chinese MMPI-2 and the English MMPI-2 was found to average 0.64 for the clinical scales and 0.68 for the content scales indicating that the Chinese MMPI-2 is an effective tool of personality assessment.

MMPI-2 in Korean 
The Korean MMPI-2 was initially translated by Kyunghee Han through a process of multiple rounds of translation (English to Korean) and back-translation (Korean to English), and it was tested in a sample of 726 Korean college students. In general, the test-retest reliabilities in the Korean sample were comparable to those in the American sample. For both culture samples, the median test-retest reliabilities were found to be higher for females than for males: 0.75 for Korean males and 0.78 for American males, whereas it was 0.85 for Korean females and 0.81 for American females. After retranslating and revising the items with minor translation accuracy problems, the final version of the Korean MMPI-2 was published in 2005. The published Korean MMPI-2 was standardized using a Korean adult normative sample, whose demographics were similar to the 2000 Korean Census data. Compared to the U. S. norm, scale means of Korean norm were significantly elevated; however, the reliabilities and validity of the Korean MMPI-2 were still found to be comparable with the English MMPI-2. The Korean MMPI-2 was further validated by using a Korean psychiatric sample from inpatient and outpatient facilities of Samsung National Hospital in Seoul. The internal consistency of the MMPI-2 scales for the psychiatric sample was comparable to the results obtained from the normative samples.  Robust validity of the Korean MMPI-2 scales was evidenced by correlations with the SCL-90-R scales, behavioral correlates, and therapist ratings. The Korean MMPI-2 RF was published in 2011 and it was standardized using the Korean MMPI-2 normative sample with minor modifications.

MMPI-2 in Hmong 
The MMPI-2 was translated into the Hmong language by Deinard, Butcher, Thao, Vang and Hang. The items for the Hmong-language MMPI-2 were obtained by translation and back-translation from the English version. After linguistic evaluation to ensure that the Hmong-language MMPI-2 was equivalent to the English MMPI-2, studies to assess whether the scales meant and measured the same concepts across the different languages. It was found that the findings from both the Hmong-language and English MMPI-2 were equivalent, indicating that the results obtained for a person tested with either version were very similar.

MMPI-3 
The MMPI-3 is currently available in English, French (for Canada) and Spanish forms.

See also 
16PF Questionnaire
Diagnostic classification and rating scales used in psychiatry
Employment testing
Neuroticism Extraversion Openness Personality Inventory (NEO-PI)
Therapeutic assessment

Endnotes

References

External links
MMPI-2, Pearson Website
Minnesota Multiphasic Personality Inventory (MMPI): An Introduction
MMPI-A (Minnesota Multiphasic Personality Inventory-Adolescent)
MMPI Research Project

1943 establishments in Minnesota
Personality tests
University of Minnesota